Mariah Allison Lee (born June 30, 1996) is an American professional soccer player who plays as a forward for Spanish Primera División club Sporting de Huelva.

Club career

OL Reign
Lee made her NWSL debut in the 2020 NWSL Challenge Cup on July 8, 2020.

References

External links
 
 
 Stanford profile
 Wake Forest profile
 

1996 births
Living people
American women's soccer players
National Women's Soccer League players
Stanford Cardinal women's soccer players
Wake Forest Demon Deacons women's soccer players
OL Reign players
Celtic F.C. Women players
Scottish Women's Premier League players
American expatriate women's soccer players
American expatriate sportspeople in Scotland
Expatriate women's footballers in Scotland
Women's association football forwards
FF Lugano 1976 players
American expatriate sportspeople in Switzerland
Expatriate women's footballers in Switzerland
American expatriate sportspeople in Spain
Expatriate women's footballers in Spain
Primera División (women) players
Sporting de Huelva players
People from Covington, Washington
Soccer players from Washington (state)